Roger Smith may refer to:

Entertainment
Roger Smith (actor) (1932–2017), American television and film actor and screenwriter
Roger Craig Smith (born 1975), American voice actor
Roger Guenveur Smith (born 1955), American writer, director, and actor
Roger Smith, American musician, known as keyboarder of funk band Tower of Power
Roger Smith (The Big O), lead character in The Big O
Roger (American Dad!), the Smiths' "pet" alien in American Dad!

Sports
Roger Smith (footballer, born 1944), English footballer
Roger Smith (footballer, born 1945), English footballer
Roger Smith (New Zealand footballer)
Roger Smith (field hockey) (born 1960), former Australian field hockey player
Roger Smith (tennis) (born 1964), Bahamian tour tennis player

Other
Roger Smith (executive) (1925–2007), American businessman, CEO of GM
Roger Smith (biologist), founder of the Millennium Seed Bank Project
Roger Smith (journalist) (born 1951), Canadian television journalist
Roger W. Smith (born 1970), British watchmaker
Bird and Roger Smith, co-founders of the Scouting movement in the Malaysian state of Negeri Sembilan